The men's singles badminton tournament at the 2020 Summer Olympics took place from 24 July to 2 August 2021 at the Musashino Forest Sport Plaza at Tokyo. A total of 41 players from 36 nations actually competed at the tournament.

Viktor Axelsen of Denmark won his first Olympic gold, defeating defending Olympic champion Chen Long from China. He became the first non-Asian — specifically Danish — to win Olympic badminton men's singles since Poul-Erik Høyer Larsen in 1996. Anthony Sinisuka Ginting of Indonesia won bronze by defeating four-time Olympian Kevin Cordón of Guatemala. He became the first Youth Olympic badminton medalist to win a medal at the Olympics, having also won bronze in 2014.

Background
This was the 8th appearance of the event as a full medal event. Badminton was introduced as a demonstration sport in 1972, held again as an exhibition sport in 1988, and added to the full programme in 1992; the men's singles tournament had been held since.

The reigning champion was Chen Long of China, who also won bronze in 2012. 2016 bronze medalist Viktor Axelsen of Denmark also qualified. The top-ranked qualifier was Kento Momota of Japan who was also the reigning world champion.

Qualification

The badminton qualification system was designed to ensure that 86 men and 86 women receive quota spots; the size of the men's singles field adjusts to hit that target quota. Following revisions due to the COVID-19 pandemic, the qualifying periods were set on 29 April 2019 to 15 March 2020 and 4 January to 13 June 2021, with the ranking list of 15 June 2021 deciding qualification.

There were 38 initial quota places for the men's singles: 34 from the ranking list, 3 from Tripartite Commission invitations, and 1 host nation place. Nations with multiple players in the top 16 of the ranking list could earn 2 quota places; all others were limited to 1. Players were taken from the ranking list in order, respecting the national limits, until the places were filled. Each continent was guaranteed one spot, either through the invitational spots or by replacing the lowest-ranked player if necessary. The host nation spot was unused since Japan qualified two players through the ranking list and was reallocated to the ranking list.

Additional places beyond 38 were added where players qualified in both the men's singles and one of the doubles events. This resulted in 3 additional places added to the ranking list. One place was also given to a member of the Refugee Team, Aram Mahmoud. The total of qualified players was thus 42.

Competition format
The tournament started with a group phase round-robin followed by a knockout stage. For the group stage, the players were divided into between 12 and 16 groups of between 3 and 4 players each. Each group played a round-robin. The top player in each group advanced to the knockout rounds. The knockout stage was a four-round single elimination tournament with a bronze medal match. If there were fewer than 16 groups in the group stage, some players received a bye in the round of 16.

Matches were played best-of-three games. Each game was played to 21, except that a player must win by 2 unless the score reaches 30–29.

Schedule
The tournament was held over a 10-day period, with 9 competition days and 1 open day.

Seeds
A total of 14 players were given seeds.

 (group stage)
 (quarter-finals)
 (quarter-finals) 
{{flagIOCathlete|Viktor Axelsen|DEN|2020 Summer}} (gold medalist)
 (bronze medalist)
 (silver medalist)
 (round of 16)

<li> (group stage)
<li> (round of 16)
<li> (round of 16)
<li> (quarter-finals)
<li> (round of 16)
<li> (group stage)
<li> (group stage)

Group stage
The group stage was played from 24 to 28 July. The winner of each group advanced to the knockout rounds.

Group A

Group C

Group D

Group E

Group F

Group G

Group H

Group I

Group J

Group K

Group L

Group M

Group N

Group P

Finals
The knockout stage was played from 29 July to 2 August. One round was held per day, with a day off on 30 July. This stage was a single-elimination tournament with a bronze medal match.

References

External links
Group play 

Badminton at the 2020 Summer Olympics
Men's events at the 2020 Summer Olympics